Booker T. Washington Middle School refers to several schools named after the African-American education pioneer Booker T. Washington:

 Booker T. Washington Middle School (Baltimore), Baltimore
 Booker T. Washington Middle School (Newport News), Newport News, Virginia
 Booker T. Washington Middle School (New York), New York City
 Booker T. Washington Middle School (Tampa)

See also
 List of things named after Booker T. Washington